Nazarikha is a rural locality (a village) in Kumzerskoye Rural Settlement, Kharovsky District, Vologda Oblast, Russia. The population was 10 as of 2002.

Geography 
Nazarikha is located 48 km northwest of Kharovsk (the district's administrative centre) by road. Ugol is the nearest rural locality.

References 

Rural localities in Kharovsky District